Daron Council (born December 26, 1964) is an American former sprinter. He represented his country in the 200 meters at the 1991 World Indoor Championships reaching the semifinals.

He graduated from Auburn University in 1987.

International competitions

Personal bests
Outdoor
100 meters – 10.17 (+0.5 m/s, Tampa 1988)
200 meters – 20.29 (+1.5 m/s, Starkville 1985)
Indoor
60 meters – 6.63 (Fairfax 1990)
200 meters – 20.96 (Gainesville 1991)

References

All-Athletics profile

1964 births
Living people
American male sprinters
Goodwill Games medalists in athletics
Auburn University alumni
Competitors at the 1990 Goodwill Games